Trukrhysa is a genus of air-breathing land snails, terrestrial pulmonate gastropod mollusks in the family Chronidae. It is monotypic, being represented by the single species Trukrhysa pachystoma which is endemic to the Solomon Islands,  Micronesia.

References 

 Bank, R. A. (2017). Classification of the Recent terrestrial Gastropoda of the World. Last update: July 16, 2017

External links
 Pfeiffer, L. (1841). Symbolae ad historiam Heliceorum. Sectio prima [vol. 1]. Kassel: Th. Fischer. 88 pp

Fauna of Micronesia
Chronidae
Taxobox binomials not recognized by IUCN